The Anthesphoria was one of the religious festivals held in Ancient Greece in honor of Persephone's return from the Underworld. According to mythological tradition, Persephone's husband, Hades, tricked her into eating four pomegranate seeds when Zeus ordered him to let her return to her mother after he had kidnapped her. Because she ate the seeds, Persephone was then forced to spend one-third of the year in the Underworld and only allotted two-thirds of the year aboveground. This festival was held in several different regions throughout the ancient world, with each one having distinct customs and rituals.

The Athenian Anthesphoria was known to be one of the most beautiful ones, featuring flowers, music, and peaceful celebration to commemorate the return of the goddess of springtime. While the Athenian Anthesphoria was known for its beauty, other festivals such as the Sicilian Anthesphoria placed more significant weight on the holiday. In fact, the Anthesphoria was one of the most important celebrations of the year.

References 

Ancient Roman festivals
Festivals in ancient Greece
Festivals of Persephone